Muju may refer to:

Places
 Muju County, South Korea
 Muju Resort, South Korea

Other
 Mujū (1227–1312), Japanese Buddhist monk
 Muju virus
 The MUJU Crew

See also
 Muyu language